Nikopol: Secrets of the Immortals is a point and click adventure game developed by White Birds Productions and based on the graphics novels of Enki Bilal's The Nikopol Trilogy.

Plot
The year is 2023 and Paris is governed by a power-hungry dictator. As Alcide Nikopol you try to find a way of joining the underground rebellion and help stop the dictator's iron fist rule. The history takes a turn towards the weird, as Nikopol finds out that his father - an astronaut sent into orbital exile in cryopreservation - may be alive and well in the city. At the same time, a strange pyramid hovers over Paris, and a rumour of Egyptian gods residing in it spreads like wildfire.

Reception

The game received "average" reviews according to the review aggregation website Metacritic.

References

External links
 (This website is no longer available as of April, 2012)

2008 video games
Adventure games
Point-and-click adventure games
Video games developed in France
Cyberpunk video games
Windows games
Video games set in Paris
Video games based on comics
Got Game Entertainment games
Single-player video games
The Nikopol Trilogy